Bullaburra railway station is located on the Main Western line in New South Wales, Australia. It serves the Blue Mountains town of Bullaburra opening on 16 February 1925.

Platforms & services

Bullaburra has one island platform with two sides. It is serviced by NSW TrainLink Blue Mountains Line services travelling from Sydney Central to Lithgow.

Transport links
Blue Mountains Transit operates one route via Bullaburra station:
690K: Springwood to Katoomba

References

External links

Bullaburra station details Transport for New South Wales

Railway stations in Australia opened in 1925
Regional railway stations in New South Wales
Short-platform railway stations in New South Wales, 6 cars
Main Western railway line, New South Wales